Telise is a village in Lääne-Nigula Parish, Lääne County, in western Estonia.

References
 

Villages in Lääne County